= 1987 Saga gubernatorial election =

Election for Governor of Saga Prefecture

← 1983	12 April 1987	1991 →
Nominee	Kumao Katsuki	Hideo Miyake
Party	Independent	JCP
Popular vote	324,413	104,076
Governor before election
Kumao Katsuki
Independent
Elected Governor
Kumao Katsuki
Independent

A gubernatorial election was held on 12 April 1987 to elect the Governor of Saga Prefecture.

== Candidates ==
- Kumao Katsuki - incumbent Governor of Saga Prefecture, age 71
- Hideo Miyake (三宅秀夫, Miyake Hideo), age 58

== Results ==
Saga Gubernational Election 1987
Party	Candidate	Votes	%	±%
Independent	Kumao Katsuki (incumbent)	324,413		
JCP	Hideo Miyake	104,076		
